A stateless nation is an ethnic group or nation that does not possess its own state and is not the majority population in any nation state. The term "stateless" implies that the group "should have" such a state (country). Members of stateless nations may be citizens of the country in which they live, or they may be denied citizenship by that country. Stateless nations are usually not represented in international sports or in international organisations such as the United Nations. Nations without state are classified as fourth-world nations. Some of the stateless nations have a history of statehood, some were always a stateless nation, dominated by another nation.

The term was coined in 1983 by political scientist Jacques Leruez in his book L'Écosse, une nation sans État about the peculiar position of Scotland within the British state. It was later adopted and popularized by Scottish scholars such as David McCrone, Michael Keating and T. M. Devine.

Stateless nations either are dispersed across a number of states (for example, the Yakthung Limbu People residing in east of Nepal, includes (Sikkim and Darjeeling) India and north-western part of Bangladesh as the Yakthung Limbuwan nation and Yoruba people are found in the African states of Nigeria, Benin and Togo) or form the native population of a province within a larger state (such as the Uyghur people in the Xinjiang Uyghur Autonomous Region within the People's Republic of China). Some stateless nations historically had a state, which was absorbed by another; for example, Tibet's declaration of independence in 1913 was not recognized, and it was reunited in 1951 by the People's Republic of China which claims that Tibet is an integral part of China, while the Tibetan government-in-exile maintains that Tibet is an independent state under an unlawful occupation. Some ethnic groups were once a stateless nation that later became a nation state (for example, the nations of the Balkans such as the Croats, Serbs, Bosniaks, Slovenes, Montenegrins and Macedonians were once part of a multinational state of Yugoslavia; since the breakup of Yugoslavia many nation states were formed).

Stateless nations can have large populations; for example the Kurds have an estimated population of over 30 million people, which make them one of the largest stateless nations. Multiple stateless nations can reside in the same geographical region or country; for example, the Tuareg, Toubou, Rifians, Kabyle in North Africa, Chin, Kachin, Karen, Mon, Rakhine, Rohingya and Shan in Myanmar, or Galicians, Cantabrians, Asturians, Aragonese, Basques, Catalans, Valencians and Andalusians in Spain.

Nation-states and nations without states 
The symbiotic relationship between nations and states arose in early modern Western Europe (18th century) and it was exported to the rest of the world through colonial rule. Whereas the Western European nation-states are at present relinquishing some of their powers to the European Union, many of the former colonies are now the zealous defenders of the concept of national-statehood. However, not all peoples within multi-cultural states have the same awareness of being a stateless nation. As not all states are nation states, there are ethnic groups who live in multinational states without being considered "stateless nations".

Only a small fraction of the world's national groups have associated nation-states. The proportion was estimated to be 3 percent by Minahan. The rest are distributed in one or more states. While there are over 3000 estimated nations in the world, there were only 193 member states of the United Nations as of 2011, of which fewer than 20 are considered to be ethnically homogeneous nation-states. Thus nation-states are not as common as often assumed, and stateless nations are the overwhelming majority of nations in the world.

Consequences of colonialism and imperialism 

During the imperial and colonial era, powerful nations extended their influence outside their homeland and this resulted in many colonized nations ceasing to be self-governing and have since been described as stateless nations. Some nations have been victims of "carve out" and their homeland was divided among several countries. Even today the colonial boundaries form modern national boundaries. These often differ from cultural boundaries. This results in situations where people of the same language or culture are divided by national borders, for example New Guinea splits as West Papua (former Dutch colony) and Papua New Guinea (former British colony). During decolonization, the colonial powers imposed a unified state structure irrespective of the ethnic differences and granted independence to their colonies as a multinational state. This led to successor states with many minority ethnic groups in them, which increased the potential for ethnic conflicts. Some of these minority groups campaigned for self-determination. Stateless nations were not protected in all countries and become victims of atrocities such as discrimination, ethnic cleansing, genocide, forced assimilation, Exploitation of labour and natural resources.

Nationalism and stateless nations 
People with a common origin, history, language, culture, customs or religion can turn into a nation by awakening of national consciousness. A nation can exist without a state, as is exemplified by the stateless nations. Citizenship is not always the nationality of a person. In a multinational state different national identities can coexist or compete: for example, in Britain English nationalism, Scottish nationalism and Welsh nationalism exist and are held together by British nationalism. Nationalism is often connected to separatism, because a nation achieves completeness through its independence.

Throughout history, numerous nations declared their independence, but not all succeeded in establishing a state. Even today, there are active autonomy and independence movements around the world. The claim of the stateless nations to self-determination is often denied due to geopolitical interests and increasing globalization of the world. Stateless nations sometimes show solidarity with other stateless nations and maintain diplomatic relations.

Unionism vs separatism 

Not all ethnic groups claim to be a nation or aspire to be a separate state. Some of them see themselves as part of the multinational state and they believe that their interests are well represented in it. The favoring of a united single state is also associated with unionism (Pakistani nationalism, Indian nationalism, Chinese nationalism, British nationalism, Spanish nationalism, Russian nationalism). In many countries, unionism is also encouraged by governments and separatism is considered illegal.

Claims of stateless nations and ethnic groups with autonomous status

 

The following is a list of ethnic and national groups where there exist notable independence movements as evidenced by standalone Wikipedia articles.

States made bold under the "homeland" column are countries of the respective ethnic groups which are native to them and still host the majority (more than half) of their population.

Formerly stateless nations
Some stateless nations have achieved their own independent state. Examples include Greeks before the Greek War of Independence and Irish people before the Irish War of Independence and Bengalis before the Bangladesh Liberation War.

Some would include the Jews until the 1948 Israeli declaration of independence, however others would point out that different groups of Jews have very different characteristics such as languages, cultures, and territories, rendering the idea that all Jews constitute a single nation questionable.

During the dissolution of the Soviet Union and the breakup of Yugoslavia, several ethnic groups gained their own sovereign state.

See also

 Diaspora 
 Ethnic nationalism
 European Charter for Regional or Minority Languages
 Framework Convention for the Protection of National Minorities
 List of active autonomist and secessionist movements
 List of federally recognized tribes
 List of First Nations peoples
 List of unrecognized tribes in the United States
 Multinational state
 Non-FIFA international football
 Self-determination
 Sovereignty
 Stateless person
 Stateless society
 Unrepresented Nations and Peoples Organization

Notes

References

Sources

External links 
 Map of European Stateless Nations, published by the advocacy group Eurominority
 United Nations Declaration on the Rights of Persons Belonging to National or Ethnic, Religious and Linguistic Minorities

Autonomy
Cultural geography
Human rights by issue
Independence movements
State
Political science terminology
 
Secession
Sovereignty